Wila Chullpa (Aymara wila blood, blood-red, chullpa an ancient funerary building, "red chullpa") is a mountain in the Andes of Bolivia which reaches a height of approximately . It is located in the Oruro Department, on the border of the Nor Carangas Province (which is identical to the Huayllamarca Municipality) and the San Pedro de Totora Province, northeast of the village of Huacanapi.

References 

Mountains of Oruro Department